The Belyayev Babochka, was a tandem seat research aircraft designed in the USSR from 1939.

Development
Viktor Nikolayevich Belyayev had an illustrious early career with TsAGI, AVIAVnito, Aeroflot, OMOS, AGOS, KOSOS and the Tupolev OKB. He also designed and built several gliders from 1920, including flying wing designs.

Belalyev and V.I. Yukharin, at the Kazan Aviation Institute (KAI), designed a tandem seat single engined research aircraft to investigate the properties of Belyayev's forward swept wing with raked tips, used on the Belyayev DB-LK, particularly the resistance to structural instability and aileron reversal.  The aircraft was to have had quite sharply swept forward inner wings, with the outer third swept back at a similar angle, all with ailerons, except for flaps on the inner half of the inner wings. Relatively small tail surfaces were envisioned at the end of a relatively long fuselage.  The pilot and observer sat in enclosed cockpits, with the observer's cockpit halfway between the pilot's cockpit and the tail unit.
Further work on the Babochka was abandoned after the German invasion.

Specifications (Babochka)

See also

References

 Gunston, Bill. “The Osprey Encyclopaedia of Russian Aircraft 1875 – 1995”. London, Osprey. 1995.

External links
 http://www.aviation.ru/Belyayev/

1930s Soviet experimental aircraft
Babochka